The Optogalvanic effect is the change in the conductivity of a gas discharge induced by a light source (typically a laser). This effect has found many applications in atomic spectroscopy and laser stabilization.

Introduction

In general, light will couple to atomic transitions if the energy difference between atomic levels is in resonance with some of the frequencies of the incoming light, thereby exchanging energy and momentum. In a gas discharge, the gaseous medium is affected by light on resonance with the atoms or molecules in the gas, thus creating a new balance in the energetic properties of the medium. Since the medium consists of charged particles, it is not surprising that also its electrical properties change.

References

Physical phenomena